Mohammad Umar may refer to:

Mohammad Umar (Sindh cricketer) (born 1999), Pakistani cricketer for Karachi Whites and Sindh
Mohammad Umar (Lahore Blues cricketer) (born 1997), Pakistani cricketer for Lahore Blues